The 1987 World Sambo Championships were held in Milan, Italy in November 1987. Championships were organized by FIAS.

Medal overview

External links 
Results on Sambo.net.ua

World Sambo Championships
1987 in sambo (martial art)
Sport in Milan